The 1978–79 Town & Country League season was the first under this name and 37th in the history of Eastern Counties Football League a football competition in England.

League table

The league featured 20 clubs which competed in the league last season, along with two new clubs:
Brantham Athletic, joined from the Essex and Suffolk Border League
Cambridge United reserves

League table

References

External links
 Eastern Counties Football League

1978-79
1978–79 in English football leagues